Darnell Thomas Sweeney (born February 1, 1991) is an American professional baseball utility player who is currently a free agent. He has played in Major League Baseball (MLB) for the Toronto Blue Jays and Philadelphia Phillies.

Early life and amateur career
Sweeney's father, a native of the British Virgin Islands, tutored Sweeney in baseball from the age of four and taught him to switch hit.

Sweeney attended Fort Lauderdale High School for the 2005–2006 school year. Due to relocation Darnell finished off his prep career at American Senior High School. He was drafted in the 41st round of the 2009 MLB draft by the Florida Marlins but did not sign.

Sweeney attended college at the University of Central Florida (UCF), where he played college baseball for the UCF Knights. Sweeney had committed to play for UCF before receiving a scholarship offer from Miami and chose to honor his commitment to UCF. He was selected to the Conference USA All-Freshman Team with a .358 batting average, 83 hits and 17 stolen bases. As a junior he was named to the Coral Gables All-Regional Team and was a Conference USA Preseason First Teamer. In 2011, he played collegiate summer baseball with the Harwich Mariners of the Cape Cod Baseball League.

Professional career

Los Angeles Dodgers

The Los Angeles Dodgers selected Sweeney in the 13th round of the 2012 MLB draft. In 2012 with the Ogden Raptors of the Pioneer League he hit .303, stole 10 bags in 16 games. On July 8, 2012, he was called up to the Great Lakes Loons of the Midwest League.  There he hit .291, 23 RBI, 5 HR and stole 17 bases in only 51 games. In 2013 with the Rancho Cucamonga Quakes of the California League, he hit .275 in 134 games with 11 homers, 75 RBI and 48 steals. He was promoted to the Double-A Chattanooga Lookouts for 2014. He was selected to the mid-season Southern League All-Star Game. In 132 games, he hit .288 with 14 homers and 57 RBI. After the season, he played with the Glendale Desert Dogs in the Arizona Fall League and was selected to the AFL Top Prospects List. The Dodgers invited him to attend major league spring training in 2015. He was assigned to the Triple-A Oklahoma City Dodgers and selected to the mid-season all-star team.

Philadelphia Phillies
On August 19, 2015, Sweeney and fellow minor leaguer John Richy were traded to the Philadelphia Phillies for Chase Utley. The Phillies immediately added Sweeney to the major league roster. He made his MLB debut August 20 as a pinch hitter.  His first major league hit – a home run – came on August 22 in Miami against the Marlins.

Return to the Dodgers
On November 11, 2016, he was traded back to the Dodgers (along with Darin Ruf) in exchange for Howie Kendrick and was assigned to Oklahoma City to begin the season. In 2017, in 38 games, he hit .227.

Cincinnati Reds
Sweeney was traded to the Cincinnati Reds on May 27, 2017, for future considerations. He was released on March 31, 2018.

Toronto Blue Jays
On April 3, 2018, Sweeney signed a minor league contract with the Toronto Blue Jays, and was assigned to the Triple-A Buffalo Bisons. He was called up by the Blue Jays on June 29 to replace Steve Pearce who had been traded to the Boston Red Sox. He was outrighted to Triple-A on July 5, 2018. Sweeney was recalled by the Blue Jays on July 31, and designated for assignment on August 2. He elected free agency on October 2.

Kansas City T-Bones
On February 12, 2019, Sweeney signed with the Kansas City T-Bones of the independent American Association.

Pittsburgh Pirates
On June 12, 2019, Sweeney's contract was purchased by the Pittsburgh Pirates. He became a free agent following the 2019 season.

Winnipeg Goldeyes
On January 31, 2020, Sweeney re-signed with the Kansas City T-Bones of the American Association. However, the T-Bones were not selected to compete in the condensed 60-game season due to the COVID-19 pandemic. He was later drafted by the Winnipeg Goldeyes in the 2020 dispersal draft.

Kansas City Monarchs
Sweeney was returned to the Kansas City T-Bones after the 2020 season on September 11, 2020. The team changed their name to the Kansas City Monarchs in the offseason. Sweeney played in 97 games for Kansas City in 2021, slashing .262/.354/.484 with 19 home runs, 69 RBI, and 22 stolen bases.

Sweeney played in 92 games for the Monarchs in 2022, being named an All-Star after posting a .321/.410/.490 slash line with 13 home runs, 49 RBI, and 31 stolen bases. He was released on October 27, 2022.

References

External links

 

1991 births
Living people
African-American baseball players
Altoona Curve players
American expatriate baseball players in Canada
Baseball players from Florida
Buffalo Bisons (minor league) players
Chattanooga Lookouts players
Glendale Desert Dogs players
Great Lakes Loons players
Harwich Mariners players
Indianapolis Indians players
Kansas City Monarchs (American Association) players
Kansas City T-Bones players
Lehigh Valley IronPigs players
Louisville Bats players
Major League Baseball second basemen
Major League Baseball outfielders
Ogden Raptors players
Oklahoma City Dodgers players
Sportspeople from Broward County, Florida
Philadelphia Phillies players
Rancho Cucamonga Quakes players
Toronto Blue Jays players
UCF Knights baseball players
Winnipeg Goldeyes players
21st-century African-American sportspeople
American expatriate baseball players in Mexico
Venados de Mazatlán players
American Senior High School (Miami-Dade County, Florida) alumni
American people of United States Virgin Islands descent
2023 World Baseball Classic players